Angela Melillo (born 20 June 1967) is an Italian actress,  showgirl, model, singer, and television hostess.

Biography 
She began her career in the entertainment world as a dancer, but her verve immediately suggested that she had more skills and a strong desire to emerge. In the 1991/1992 season, she was a showgirl at Il TG delle vacanze, where she danced with Gabriella Labate, and at various shows in the Bagaglino, first as a dancer in Creme caramel e Rose rosse, and later as a prima donna in Tutte pazze per Silvio, Al Bagaglino, Marameo and Mi consenta.

In 1992 she joined Teo Teocoli and Gene Gnocchi in conducting the first edition of Scherzi a parte, on Italia 1. From 1999 to 2001 she joined Paolo Limiti in conducting Alle due on Rai Uno.

In addition to her television career, from 2000 to 2005 she participated in several Mediaset and Rai TV series: La casa delle beffe, Love Bugs, La palestra and Il maresciallo Rocca.

In 2004 she was among the competitors of the Rai 2 reality show The Mole, which she won, proving her ability to overcome hard psychophysical tests. In 2004–2005 she was in the permanent cast of Domenica in.

In 2006 she played the role of Tiziana Palme in the Rai 1 soap-opera Sottocasa. In 2007 she played the role of Princess Luisa di Carignano in the TV miniseries La figlia di Elisa - Ritorno a Rivombrosa, directed by Stefano Alleva. From 11 October 2010 she replaced Luana Ravegnini as a co-presenter of Rai Due's TV mania alongside Simone Annicchiarico. The program, however, was canceled after the second episode due to low ratings. In October 2016 she starred in the theater comedy Una fidanzata per papà with Sandra Milo, Savino Zaba and Stefano Antonucci.

Television

Dancer 
 Cocco (Rai 2, 1989)
 Stasera mi butto (Rai 2, 1990)
 Crème Caramel (Rai 1, 1991-1992)
 Il TG delle vacanze (Canale 5, 1991-1992)
 Scherzi a parte (Italia 1, 1992)
 Il grande gioco dell'oca (Rai 2, 1993)
 Una voce per Sanremo (Tmc, 1993)
 Saluti e baci (Rai 1, 1993)
 Bucce di banana (Rai 1, 1994)
 Beato tra le donne (Rai 1, 1994)
 Rose Rosse (Canale 5, 1996)
 Gran Caffè (Canale 5, 1998)
 La zingara (Rai 1, 1999)

Other 
 Il grande gioco del Mercante in fiera (Tmc, 1996)
 Alle due su Rai Uno (Rai 1, 1999-2000) – Co-presenter
 Sereno variabile (Rai 2, 2001) – Co-presenter
 Marameo (Canale 5, 2002)
 Mi consenta (Canale 5, 2003)
 La Talpa (Rai 2, 2004) – Competitor, won
 Domenica in (Rai 1, 2004-2005) – Co-presenter
 Facce ride Show (Rete 4, 2006)
 Bellissima - Cabaret anti crisi (Canale 5, 2009)
 TV Mania (Rai 2, 2010) – Permanent guest

Filmography

Television 
 La casa delle beffe 2000 – TV miniseries – Canale 5
 La palestra 2003 – TV film– Canale 5 – as Valentina
 Il maresciallo Rocca 5 2005 – TV, 2 episodes – Rai 1 – as Elena Neccini
 Sottocasa 2006 – TV – Rai 1 – as Tiziana Palme
 Don Matteo 2006 – TV, 1 episode – Rai 1 – as Marina
 La figlia di Elisa – Ritorno a Rivombrosa 2007 – Miniserie TV, 8 episodes – Canale 5 – as Princess Luisa di Carignano

Cinema 
 Impotenti esistenziali, directed by Giuseppe Cirillo (2009)
 Al posto tuo, directed by Max Croci (2016)

Theater 
 "Tre Tre Giù Giulio" directed by Pier Francesco Pingitore
 "La Vedova Allegra" directed by Gino Landi
 "Troppa Trippa" directed by P. Pingitore
 "Crem Caramel" directed by P. Pingitore
 "Mavaffallopoli" directed by P. Pingitore
 "Tutte pazze per Silvio" directed by P. Pingitore
 "Romolo e Remolo" directed by P. Pingitore
 "Facce ride show" directed by P. Pingitore
 "Miracolo a teatro" directed by G. Liguori
 "Fashion e confucion"  directed by P. Mellucci
 "Una fidanzata per papà" directed by P. Moriconi

References

External links

Official website

1967 births
Living people
Dancers from Rome
Italian showgirls
Italian television personalities
Italian film actresses
Italian television actresses
Italian women singers
Mass media people from Rome